Sitting Bull Crystal Caverns is a limestone cave complex nine miles south of Rapid City, South Dakota on the way to Mount Rushmore and by the Wind Cave National Park. For eight decades, the cave was open for the public to tour daily from Memorial Day weekend to Labor Day weekend.

The cave was discovered by the Duhamel family, Alex and Mamie and their sons, Bud and Pete, in 1929, at their property in Rockerville Gulch. The gulch is a red rock canyon east of Rockerville. They organised tours and the Duhamel Sioux Indian Pageant to promote the caverns with a friend, Black Elk, who chose the name of the caverns in honor of his friend Sitting Bull. Black Elk held the show for over a decade from 1934 to educate people about Lakota culture. In 1992, Bud received the Ben Black Elk Award for "promotion of Native American culture." When he was 93 he retired and passed operations of the cave to his grandson, Peter Heffron.
In 2015, remaining family members decided that they no longer wanted to operate the business, and the cave was closed to the public.  At that time, the cave and about 730 acres of land were put up for sale.

References

External links
Sitting Bull Crystal Caverns

Caves of South Dakota
Limestone caves
Landforms of Pennington County, South Dakota
Show caves in the United States
Tourist attractions in Pennington County, South Dakota